AMOLED (active-matrix organic light-emitting diode) is a type of OLED display device technology. OLED describes a specific type of thin-film-display technology in which organic compounds form the electroluminescent material, and active matrix refers to the technology behind the addressing of pixels.

Since 2007, AMOLED technology has been used in mobile phones, media players, TVs and digital cameras, and it has continued to make progress toward low-power, low-cost, high resolution and large size (for example, 88-inch and 8K resolution) applications.

Design 

An AMOLED display consists of an active matrix of OLED pixels generating light (luminescence) upon electrical activation that have been deposited or integrated onto a thin-film transistor (TFT) array, which functions as a series of switches to control the current flowing to each individual pixel.

Typically, this continuous current flow is controlled by at least two TFTs at each pixel (to trigger the luminescence), with one TFT to start and stop the charging of a storage capacitor and the second to provide a voltage source at the level needed to create a constant current to the pixel, thereby eliminating the need for the very high currents required for passive-matrix OLED operation.

TFT backplane technology is crucial in the fabrication of AMOLED displays. In AMOLEDs, the two primary TFT backplane technologies, polycrystalline silicon (poly-Si) and amorphous silicon (a-Si), are currently used offering the potential for directly fabricating the active-matrix backplanes at low temperatures (below 150 °C)  onto flexible plastic substrates for producing flexible AMOLED displays.

History
AMOLED was developed in 2006. Samsung SDI was one of the main investors in the technology, and many other display companies were also developing it. One of the earliest consumer electronics products with an AMOLED display was the BenQ-Siemens S88 mobile handset and, in 2007, the iriver Clix 2 portable media player. In 2008 it appeared on the Nokia N85 followed by the Samsung i7110 - both Nokia and Samsung Electronics were early adopters of this technology on their smartphones.

Future development 

Manufacturers have developed in-cell touch panels, integrating the production of capacitive sensor arrays in the AMOLED module fabrication process. In-cell sensor AMOLED fabricators include AU Optronics and Samsung. Samsung has marketed its version of this technology as "Super AMOLED". Researchers at DuPont used computational fluid dynamics (CFD) software to optimize coating processes for a new solution-coated AMOLED display technology that is competitive in cost and performance with existing chemical vapor deposition (CVD) technology. Using custom modeling and analytic approaches, Samsung has developed short and long-range film-thickness control and uniformity that is commercially viable at large glass sizes.

Comparison to other display technologies 

Compared to other display technologies, AMOLED screens have several advantages and disadvantages.

AMOLED displays can provide higher refresh rates than passive-matrix, often have response times less than a millisecond, and they consume significantly less power. This advantage makes active-matrix OLEDs well-suited for portable electronics, where power consumption is critical to battery life.

The amount of power the display consumes varies significantly depending on the color and brightness shown. As an example, one old QVGA OLED display consumes 0.3 watts while showing white text on a black background, but more than 0.7 watts showing black text on a white background, while an LCD may consume only a constant 0.35 watts regardless of what is being shown on screen.
Of course a new FHD+ or WQHD+ display will consume much more.
 Because the black pixels turn completely off, AMOLED also has contrast ratios that are significantly higher than LCDs.

AMOLED displays may be difficult to view in direct sunlight compared with LCDs because of their reduced maximum brightness. Samsung's Super AMOLED technology addresses this issue by reducing the size of gaps between layers of the screen. Additionally, PenTile technology is often used for a higher resolution display while requiring fewer subpixels than needed otherwise, sometimes resulting in a display less sharp and more grainy than a non-PenTile display with the same resolution.

The organic materials used in AMOLED displays are very prone to degradation over a relatively short period of time, resulting in color shifts as one color fades faster than another, image persistence, or burn-in.

As of 2010, demand for AMOLED screens was high and, due to supply shortages of the Samsung-produced displays, certain models of HTC smartphones were changed to use next-generation LCD displays from the Samsung-Sony joint-venture SLCD in the future.

Flagship smartphones sold in 2020 and 2021 used either a Super AMOLED. Super AMOLED displays, such as the one on the Samsung Galaxy S21+ / S21 Ultra and Samsung Galaxy Note 20 Ultra have often been compared to IPS LCDs, found in phones such as the Xiaomi Mi 10T, Huawei Nova 5T, and Samsung Galaxy A20e. For example, according to ABI Research, the AMOLED display found in the Motorola Moto X draws just 92 mA during bright conditions and 68 mA while dim. On the other hand, compared with the IPS, the yield rate of AMOLED is low; the cost is also higher.

Marketing terms

Super AMOLED 
"Super AMOLED" is a marketing term created by Samsung for an AMOLED display with an integrated touch screen digitizer: the layer that detects touch is integrated into the display, rather than overlaid on top of it and cannot be separated from the display itself. The display technology itself is not improved. According to Samsung, Super AMOLED reflects one-fifth as much sunlight as the first generation AMOLED. The generic term for this technology is One Glass Solution (OGS).

Comparison 

Below is a mapping table of marketing terms versus resolutions and sub-pixel types. Note how the pixel density relates to choices of sub-pixel type.

Future 
Future displays exhibited from 2011 to 2013 by Samsung have shown flexible, 3D, transparent Super AMOLED Plus displays using very high resolutions and in varying sizes for phones. These unreleased prototypes use a polymer as a substrate removing the need for glass cover, a metal backing, and touch matrix, combining them into one integrated layer.

So far, Samsung plans on branding the newer displays as Youm, or y-octa.

Also planned for the future are 3D stereoscopic displays that use eye-tracking (via stereoscopic front-facing cameras) to provide full resolution 3D visuals.

References

External links 
 

Mobile phones
Conductive polymers
Display technology
Molecular electronics
Optical diodes
Organic electronics